WWJK (107.3 FM) is a commercial radio station licensed to Green Cove Springs, Florida, and serving the Greater Jacksonville radio market. The station broadcasts a mainstream rock radio format and is owned by iHeartMedia, Inc.

WWJK's radio studios are on Central Parkway in Jacksonville's Southside neighborhood, and the transmitter is off Hogan Road in the Arlington section.

History
The station signed on in May 1977 as beautiful music WJEE.  In 1981, it switched to country music as WCRJ. In 1991, the call sign changed to WROO as "Rooster Country".

On December 19, 2005 it became the new home for alternative rock station WPLA "Planet Radio". While WPLA saw its ratings rise after the frequency change, the station began losing ground when it had to split the alternative rock audience when 102.9 WXXJ (now WEZI) signed on in 2009.

On August 4, 2010 the station flipped to classic hits-formatted "Magic 107.3", competing primarily against WJGL. On October 13, 2010, WPLA changed call letters to WJGH. Neal Sharpe was named program director and assumed the position on November 18, 2010.

On April 18, 2012 the station flipped to adult hits as "107.3 Jack FM" (later adopting the call sign WWJK to go with the new Jack-FM branding). In May 2013, program director Skip Kelly (formerly of WFKS, KIIS-FM, KYSR and WXKS-FM) was brought in.

On April 17, 2017 WWJK dropped the "Jack FM" brand and re-branded as "107.3 Jacksonville", with no change in format. The branding would be short-lived, as the station would re-brand again on May 26 as "107.3 The River".

On March 8, 2019 WWJK flipped to mainstream rock again as "107.3 Planet Radio", returning the brand and format to both WWJK and a full-power signal. The syndicated Lex and Terry morning show also returned to the station.

References

External links
Planet Radio Jacksonville Facebook

WJK
Mainstream rock radio stations in the United States
Radio stations established in 1977
IHeartMedia radio stations
1977 establishments in Florida